Cyphomyia is a genus of flies in the subfamily Clitellariinae.

Species
Cyphomyia abana Curran, 1929
Cyphomyia acuminata James, 1940
Cyphomyia aczeli James, 1953
Cyphomyia affinis Gerstaecker, 1857
Cyphomyia albicaput (Walker, 1849)
Cyphomyia albispina Enderlein, 1914
Cyphomyia albitarsis (Fabricius, 1805)
Cyphomyia albomaculata (Macquart, 1834)
Cyphomyia albopilosa Yang, Zhang & Li, 2014
Cyphomyia altifrons James, 1939
Cyphomyia androgyna Osten Sacken, 1886
Cyphomyia auriflamma Wiedemann, 1819
Cyphomyia aurifrons Wiedemann, 1830
Cyphomyia banksi James, 1937
Cyphomyia baoruca Woodley, 2014
Cyphomyia bicarinata Williston, 1900
Cyphomyia brevis James, 1940
Cyphomyia chalybea (Wiedemann, 1824)
Cyphomyia chinensis Ôuchi, 1938
Cyphomyia chrysodota Perty, 1833
Cyphomyia claripennis Macquart, 1847
Cyphomyia coprates (Walker, 1849)
Cyphomyia curvispina Enderlein, 1914
Cyphomyia cyanea (Fabricius, 1794)
Cyphomyia dispar Schiner, 1868
Cyphomyia dominicana James, 1967
Cyphomyia ecuadoriensis Enderlein, 1914
Cyphomyia erecta McFadden, 1969
Cyphomyia erectispinis Lindner, 1935
Cyphomyia fascipes Walker, 1854
Cyphomyia fassli Lindner, 1949
Cyphomyia ferruginea Enderlein, 1914
Cyphomyia flaviceps (Walker, 1856)
Cyphomyia flavimana Gerstaecker, 1857
Cyphomyia flavipennis Enderlein, 1914
Cyphomyia formosa James, 1940
Cyphomyia geniculata Gerstaecker, 1857
Cyphomyia golbachi James, 1953
Cyphomyia gracilicornis Gerstaecker, 1857
Cyphomyia helvipennis Enderlein, 1914
Cyphomyia hybrida Gerstaecker, 1857
Cyphomyia indica Brunetti, 1920
Cyphomyia jamesi Lindner, 1949
Cyphomyia lasiophthalma Williston, 1896
Cyphomyia leucocephala Wiedemann, 1819
Cyphomyia longicornis (Walker, 1857)
Cyphomyia marginata Loew, 1866
Cyphomyia marshalli Lindner, 1937
Cyphomyia neivai James, 1940
Cyphomyia nigripes Meijere, 1919
Cyphomyia nigritarsis Enderlein, 1914
Cyphomyia notabilis (Walker, 1856)
Cyphomyia nubilipennis James, 1939
Cyphomyia obscura (Jaennicke, 1867)
Cyphomyia obscuripalpis Meijere, 1919
Cyphomyia ochracea Giglio-Tos, 1891
Cyphomyia orientalis Kertész, 1914
Cyphomyia ornata Walker, 1850
Cyphomyia picta Schiner, 1868
Cyphomyia pilosissima Gerstaecker, 1857
Cyphomyia planifrons James, 1939
Cyphomyia pulchella Gerstaecker, 1857
Cyphomyia regularis Curran, 1929
Cyphomyia rohweri (Cockerell, 1916)
Cyphomyia rubra Loew, 1866
Cyphomyia scalaris Bigot, 1876
Cyphomyia schwarzi James, 1940
Cyphomyia shannoni James, 1939
Cyphomyia simplex Walker, 1860
Cyphomyia souzalopesi Iide, 1967
Cyphomyia speciosa Lindner, 1951
Cyphomyia sulcifrons Curran, 1929
Cyphomyia tomentosa Gerstaecker, 1857
Cyphomyia unicolor (Walker, 1854)
Cyphomyia varipes Gerstaecker, 1857
Cyphomyia verticalis Gerstaecker, 1857
Cyphomyia violacea Macquart, 1855
Cyphomyia whiteheadi Woodley, 1991
Cyphomyia wiedemanni Gerstaecker, 1857
Cyphomyia willistoni Enderlein, 1914

References

External links 

Stratiomyidae
Brachycera genera
Taxa named by Christian Rudolph Wilhelm Wiedemann